A constitutional referendum was held in Ghana on 27 April 1960. The main issue was a change in the country's status from a constitutional monarchy with Elizabeth II as head of state, to a republic with a presidential system of government.

Results

Aftermath
Presidential elections were held alongside the referendum, which were won by the incumbent Prime Minister, Kwame Nkrumah. He was inaugurated on 1 July 1960, replacing Queen Elizabeth II as head of state, and thus eliminating the post of Governor-General.

Four years later, another referendum strengthened the president's powers and turned the country into a one-party state (with an official result of 99.91% in support).

1960 referendums
1960 in Ghana
Referendums in Ghana
Ghana
Constitutional referendums
Monarchy referendums
Election and referendum articles with incomplete results